Colours in the Dark is the fourth studio album released by Finnish vocalist Tarja Turunen. The record was released on 30 August 2013, in Austria, Brazil, Finland, Germany, Portugal, Spain, and Switzerland; 2 September in Norway, Poland, and the Czech Republic; 3 September in the United States and Canada; and 4 September in Belgium, Denmark, the Netherlands, Sweden, and the UK. Mixing was done by Tim Palmer in Austin, Texas in the United States. Tarja started the Colours in the Dark World Tour on 17 October 2013, to promote the album. The name of the album, as the cover image, came as a metaphor from the idea that life has a large range of colors and the dark absorbs all of them, containing every color.

An official lyric video of the song "Never Enough" was released 31 May. The video was shot in Zlin, Czech Republic. The song was also released as a single on iTunes. The first music video for "Victim of Ritual" was shot in Berlin, Germany, and was released on 10 July. A promo teaser was released on 26 June. On 12 September 2013, earMUSIC, Tarja's label, announced that the second single taken from the album is going to be "500 Letters". It would be released as a strictly limited CD single and download at the end of October. A promo teaser of the videoclip was released on 25 October and they announced that the premiere was going to be on 31 October. "500 Letters" was released on 1 November 2013 as a digital download only. On 20 February it was revealed on the blog that a new version of the album called Left in the Dark would be released later this year and will feature different versions of the songs on the original Colours in the Dark including acoustic versions of 500 Letters & Until Silence. A competition was held, with special prizes for the 5 best artworks.

Background
The vocal recordings of the album started late 2012 and continued throughout the beginning of 2013. Titles of the album's songs were revealed from times to times through Tarja's blog, like she did with My Winter Storm (2007). The album's name came out of the song "Until Silence". This is the third time the album's name came out of one of the songs. The artwork and some promotional pictures for this album were taken mainly in India during the What Lies Beneath World Tour in 2011. During the end of that tour Tarja already performed "Into the Sun" and a different version of "Never Enough". Both songs ended up on the Colours in the Dark album and were also featured on the Act I video album.

During the process of composition, Tarja alleged that she "had to learn a lot as a soloist, for good and or evil, and often in the past years [she] thought that [she] would never reach a day coming to the point where [she is] today", also adding that she had a lot of "positive and negative" experiences that would finish on this record, that is "very rich in colors, shadows, deep aspects and that it does not capture at the first listen".

During the middle of 2013, Turunen began via earMUSIC uploading two videos per week until the album itself was released. The official pre-listening started one week prior to the album's release. The album cover was created by artist Dirk Rudolph.

Songs and lyrics 
The first single and the first song of the album, "Victim of Ritual" was described by Tarja as a rock song. According to the singer, the track it is very theatrical and has all aspects of her career, as the symphonic side and the aggressive guitars. Regarding your concept, she said for Sonic Shocks that "it is a powerful story, about how rituals ... we ourselves are subject to some rituals sometimes and we don't even realize it, I wanted to take this subject and put it in a song."

"Lucid Dreamer" is about her love with soundtrack, and she sees that song as a psychedelic one. In the "Mystique Voyage", Turunen uses three languages: english, spanish and finnish. Tarja talked for the El Litoral that the track is like a trip and there are many journeys on it. "Deliverance" is the first love song Turunen wrote, she revealed that, for this music, she worked closely with Jim Dooley. The last track of the album, "Medusa" has a beautiful and mythological story. About the process of composition, the artist said that "Medusa is a very strong, mystical, very inspiring female character. The story came too late for me, I was already in the recording process, testing the vocal harmonies, and then 'oh!' I heard the snakes singing their harmonies in vocal backing, the choirs, then I thought 'the snakes are singing' is crazy (laughs) so I soon thought of her. Now it's a duet that I do with Justin Furstenfeld, he's from the band Blue October, and I love the work he did, the vocals were amazing so, have fun!"

Critical reception

"Colours In The Dark” was a worldwide chart success, few days after the release, the album collected five Top 10 entries. In Czech Republic the record received the gold disc certification.

The response from the critics was good as well. For Classic Rock Prog, "Colours In The Dark" must surely be Turunen’s strongest solo release to date. Infernal Masquerade, SOUNDI and Lust For Life Magazine have the same thoughts, saying that's "the best Tarja album to date". According to Fireworks, with this album, "Tarja has reached a level of sustained maturity and dynamism with her song writing and singing whereby nothing is beyond her capability". The site also praises the first single, "Victim Of Ritual", calling it "simply stunning".

Todd Lyons at About.com gave the album a somewhat favourable review, but not without criticism; he described it as "riskier than Tarja's previous three solo albums", and that it was "a huge panorama of operatic metal, where some artistic experimentation is attempted, but repeatedly crushed under the album's bombast", whilst also referring to "Lucid Dreamer" as "maddeningly flawed". Metal Hammer give the album a score 5 out of 7, while TeamRock give the 4 out 5. Anette Olzon, Tarja's replacement in Nightwish, expressed appreciation for the album, commenting that "it's really her best album so far" and also thought that Tarja's "definitely found her own style".

Track listing

Notes
Special edition includes a 40-page picture booklet and download code for bonus track.
Limited box set edition includes the special edition of the album, exclusive "Colours in the Dark" T-shirt, 60-page photo book (150g paper), double sided poster (A2 size), photo collage poster (A2 size) and download code for 3 bonus tracks.

Personnel
Adapted from the album's booklet.

Musicians
 Tarja Turunen - Lead vocals and piano
 Alex Scholpp, Julian Barrett - Guitar
 Kevin Chown, Doug Wimbish - Bass
 Christian Kretschmar - Keyboards
 Mike Terrana - Drums
 Max Lilja - Cello

Additional musicians
Thomas Bloch - Glass harmonica, Cristal Baschet
Saro Danielian - Duduk, Oboe
Doug Wimbish - Cinemasonics
Mamu - Seagull
Justin Furstenfeld - Vocals ("Medusa")
Caroline Lavelle - Cello
Naomi Cabuli Turunen (Tarja's daughter) ("Lucid Dreamer")

Production
James Dooley - Orchestral & Choir Arrangements, tracks 1, 3, 5, 7, 8, 9
Bart Hendrickson - Orchestral & Choir Arrangements, track 10
Max Lilja - Orchestral Arrangement for multiple cello
Mel Wesson - Ambient music design, track 3, 4, 7
Tim Palmer - Programming, track 3, 4, 5
Mel Wesson - Programming, track 7
Bart Hendrickson - Programming, track 10
Mic - Shells recorded with iPhone in Antigua, track 5
Jetro Vainio, Mario Altamirano, Torsten Stenzel, Daniel Willy - Recording engineers
Martin Muscatello, José Maradei - Assistant engineers
Tim Palmer - Additional production & mixes
Alex Scholpp, Julian Barrett, Jim Dooley - Executive producers

Charts

Album

Certifications

References

External links
 Tarja-coloursinthedark.com
 Facebook.com
 Tarjaturunen.com

Tarja Turunen albums
2013 albums